An Ung-nam (born 7 April 1948) is a North Korean judoka. He competed in the men's half-heavyweight event at the 1976 Summer Olympics.

References

External links

1948 births
Living people
North Korean male judoka
Olympic judoka of North Korea
Judoka at the 1976 Summer Olympics
Place of birth missing (living people)